Sant'Orsola is Roman Catholic parish church located in the town of Campogalliano in the province of Modena, region of Emilia-Romagna, Italy.

History
An earlier church in Campogalliano was dedicated to St Ambrose, but in the 15th century it was replaced by a new church dedicated to St Agatha, named as parish church in 1501. That building was replaced by the present one in 1795, and refurbished and enlarged in 1830 by adding the flanking aisles. The bell-tower was also replaced in the 19th century. The interior contains altarpieces depicting the life of St Ursula painted during 1610–1614 by Lavinia Fontana.

References
Derived from Italian Wikipedia entry

18th-century Roman Catholic church buildings in Italy
Churches in the province of Modena
Neoclassical architecture in Emilia-Romagna
Neoclassical church buildings in Italy